NTDEC (whose full name is Nintendo Electronic Co.), was a Taiwanese manufacturer of cartridges, accessories and original games for NES and Famicom. For both they also manufactured converters to play Famicom titles on the NES. The company was founded in 1983 (according to the Asder official website), but in the 80's its activities were and are still today unknown.

NTDEC gained notoriety in the early 1990s for their large-scale piracy of Nintendo Entertainment System games along with their unauthorized use of the Nintendo trademark. This led to the arrest of a few of their employees and the discontinuation of the NTDEC line.

History

Copyright infringement

NTDEC produced a large number of unlicensed video game copies between 1989 and 1991, which were sold in Asia and in the United States via mail order. Unusual among counterfeit cartridge manufacturers, they're often identifiable through the company logo on it and the in-game copyright notice modified to read "NTDEC", as well as the rear label featuring a green  stripe.

Nintendo of America, Inc. v. NTDEC
Two NTDEC employees were arrested in 1991 for the company's activities distributing cartridges in the US, and legal action was brought against the company by Nintendo shortly after for copyright infringement, as well as its use of the "Nintendo" trademark in its company name.

Nintendo's legal action of 1991 concluded in 1993 with Nintendo being awarded $24,059,062 plus attorneys fees of $108,829.00 and costs of $709.80, and a worldwide permanent injunction preventing NTDEC from infringing Nintendo's intellectual property rights. At this point the company ceased operations under the NTDEC name.

Original games
Between 1991 and 1993, NTDEC developed and published a number of original games in Asia, some of which were distributed in parts of South America and Europe. Many of these were credited to Mega Soft, a California-based company which was listed in Nintendo of America, Inc. v. NTDEC as their North American distribution arm. Six games previously released by them in 1991 were compiled on the Caltron 6 in 1 multicart in 1992, which was distributed in the United States - since this cartridge contains only NTDEC/Mega Soft games and carries the same CN-xx ID as the previous original NTDEC games; Caltron (or Caltron Ind. Inc.) is believed to be the same company as NTDEC.

List of titles as NTDEC

List of titles as Mega Soft

List of titles as Caltron

Unreleased titles
 Dragon Palace Adventure
 The Pearl Turn
 Caltron 9 in 1

Asder

Following the legal action of 1993, the company appears to have ceased operations under the NTDEC name. Another Taiwanese company, Asder Electronic Co., Ltd, has released educational computer systems and TV game joypads containing Mega Soft games, and several original Famicom games continuing NTDEC's CN-xx numbering. However, it's unknown whether this company is NTDEC with a new name, or a separate company that obtained the rights to past titles from them.

List of games

Note: The title Master Shooter, included only in Asder 20-in-1, is the hack of the game of the same name (listed in the same compilation as Shooter: Part1).

References

External links
 Asder
 Caltron 6 in 1

Electronics companies of Taiwan
Video game development companies
Video game publishers
Defunct video game companies of Taiwan
Copyright infringement of software
Video game law
Video game controversies